Pathoumphone District  is a district (muang) of Champasak province in southwestern Laos.

References

Districts of Champasak province